Timothy J. Anderson (born November 22, 1980) is a former American football defensive tackle who played in the National Football League (NFL). He was drafted by the Buffalo Bills in the third round of the 2004 NFL Draft. He played college football at Ohio State.
Anderson was also a member of the Atlanta Falcons and Dallas Cowboys of the NFL and the Hartford Colonials of the United Football League.

Early years
Anderson played high school football in Clyde, Ohio where he received both All-Ohio and All-American honors.  Tim also was a wrestling standout winning Ohio's division II state title his junior and senior seasons in the 275 class.

College career
He then attended Ohio State University, where he was a starter for three years.  As a freshman, Anderson played behind Ryan Pickett on the depth chart.  When Pickett skipped his senior season to enter the NFL draft, Anderson stepped up and that season recorded three sacks and nine tackles for loss.  Anderson's best remembered play at Ohio State came in the 2002 national championship season, when he batted down a fourth-down pass from Illinois's Jon Beutjer in overtime to preserve Ohio State's 23-16 victory.

Professional career

Buffalo Bills
Anderson was selected by the Bills in the third round of the 2004 NFL Draft.  Anderson played in only one game in 2004, but started several in 2005.  On October 16, 2005 against the New York Jets, Anderson tackled Jets quarterback Vinny Testaverde for the first and only sack of his career. Anderson was released by the Bills on October 20, 2007

Atlanta Falcons
On November 1, 2007, he signed with the Falcons. He re-signed with the team on March 10, 2008. He was released on September 1, 2008.

Dallas Cowboys
After spending the 2008 season out of football, Anderson was signed by the Dallas Cowboys on January 26, 2009. He was released on August 15, 2009.

Hartford Colonials
After spending the 2009 season out of football, Anderson was signed by the Hartford Colonials of the United Football League on July 23, 2010. He was released on September 3.

References

1980 births
Living people
People from Clyde, Ohio
Players of American football from Ohio
American football defensive tackles
Ohio State Buckeyes football players
Buffalo Bills players
Atlanta Falcons players
Dallas Cowboys players
Hartford Colonials players